The Gallaudet D-4 was an unusual biplane designed and built by Gallaudet Aircraft Company for the United States Navy. It was powered by a Liberty L-12 engine buried within the fuselage which turned a large, four-bladed propeller attached to a ring around the center fuselage. Only two were constructed, with the second being accepted by the Navy for service as an observation aircraft.

Development
In response to a requirement by the U.S. Navy for light floatplanes capable of being launched off catapults by ships underway, the Gallaudet Aircraft company began development of the "D-4", based on the earlier Gallaudet D-1. The D-1 was powered by two Duesenberg engines of  each and used a clutch mechanism to allow the use of one or both engines. The D-1 made its first flight on 17 July 1916 and despite numerous mechanical difficulties the Army bought four of the improved D-2 versions.

In an effort to produce an aircraft with the best possible forward visibility for the observer, Gallaudet developed the D-2 into the unconventional D-4, which placed the observer in the nose, followed by the pilot, with the propeller attached to a ring that circled the fuselage behind the wings. The four blades spun around the fuselage just behind the pilot.

Power for the D-4 was supplied by a  Liberty engine buried within the fuselage just behind the pilot. A large pontoon was mounted below the fuselage, and small outboard floats were mounted near the tips of the swept-back wings.

Operational history
Two D-4s were built, serial numbers A:2653 and A:2654. The prototype crashed as result of a failed elevator control during flight testing on 19 July 1918, killing the pilot, Lt. Arthur Souther. The second D4 first flew in October 1918 and was accepted by the U.S. Navy in April 1919. This aircraft was entered in the Curtiss Marine Trophy Race during the National Air Races in Detroit Michigan on October 8, 1922, but had to leave the race after the fifth lap because of a broken propeller. No further aircraft were built, as Gallaudet turned their attention to constructing Curtiss HS-2L flying boats.

Operators

United States Navy

Specifications

See also

References

External links
Photos of D-4 at airminded.net.  Accessed 2011-09-30.
Photo of D-4 at earlyaviators.com. Accessed 2011-09-30.

D-4
1910s United States military reconnaissance aircraft
Biplanes
Aircraft first flown in 1918